Kvesjøen is a lake in Lierne municipality in Trøndelag county, Norway. The lake lies just inside the Norwegian border with Sweden, on the west end of the lake Murusjøen. The lake contains at least six different fish species; Arctic char, burbot, two different species of trout, grayling and pike.

See also
List of lakes in Norway

References

Lierne
Lakes of Trøndelag